The 1st Squadron, 108th Cavalry Regiment is a Reconnaissance, Surveillance, and Target Acquisition squadron of the 48th Infantry Brigade Combat Team (48th IBCT), Georgia Army National Guard. 1st Squadron provides the 48th IBCT both mounted and dismounted reconnaissance capabilities. Prior to 2007, the unit was designated as the 1st Battalion, 108th Armor Regiment.

History

Desert Storm & Bosnia and Herzegovina
The 1st Battalion, 108th Armor mobilized for Desert Storm, but were not deployed in time to be able to participate in the war. After certifying at the National Training Center as combat-ready, they demobilized.

The 1st Battalion, 108th Armor deployed to Bosnia and Herzegovina for Stabilization Force (SFOR) Rotation 9 to provide support operations for Task Force Eagle (United States contingent to United Nations Operations in support of Dayton Peace Accord). The SFOR9 rotation was scheduled from April to October 2001.

War on Terrorism
The 1st Battalion, 108th Armor mobilized as a component of the 48th Brigade Combat Team in 2004 for combat operations in support of the Global War on Terrorism. It was augmented with an additional Infantry company from Alabama and organized as Task Force (TF) Roughrider. In May 2005 the unit began deploying to Iraq as part of Operation Iraqi Freedom (OIF) and experienced some of the fiercest combat actions in the campaign. During the first half of the brigade's deployment (Spring 2005 through Spring 2006) to Iraq, the 1-108th spent much of its time conducting cordon and search operations, reconnaissance missions, and raids in Iraq's Triangle of Death region southwest of Baghdad. The unit's focus shifted during the second half of the deployment to a theater security mission primarily consisting of convoy escort and civilian military operations. On 20 April 2006, at Ft. Stewart, members of the 1-108th returned home after a year of combat operations in Iraq.

TF Roughrider suffered seven fatalities while deployed to Iraq:
SGT Paul A. Saylor (15 August 2005) 
SPC Joshua P. Dingler (15 August 2005) 
SGT Thomas J. Strickland (15 August 2005) 
SGT Michael J. Stokely (16 August 2005) 
SSG George R. Draughn, Jr. (1 September 2005) 
SFC Robert Hollar, Jr. (1 September 2005) 
1SG Aaron D. Jagger (9 August 2006)

As a part of the United States Army's ongoing transformation to a lighter, more modular force the 1st Battalion, 108th Armor was re-designated as the 1st Squadron, 108th Cavalry (RSTA) in 2007. The unit traded in its M1 Abrams tanks and its M2 Bradley Fighting Vehicles for up-armored HMMWVs. Most of the squadron's tank crewmen have reclassified to 19D cavalry scouts or 11B infantrymen.

In December 2007, the Georgia National Guard's 48th Infantry Brigade Combat Team (IBCT) was alerted that it will be deployed to Afghanistan in the summer of 2009 in support of Operation Enduring Freedom (OEF). In January 2009, the 1-108th began training for the expected year-long deployment. The unit was subsequently deployed to Afghanistan in April as Task Force Roughrider.

While deployed in support of Operation Enduring Freedom, the 1-108th participated in training the Afghan Security Forces while conducting Counter Insurgency Operations throughout the country. In March 2010 the unit redeployed from Afghanistan and demobilized at Fort Stewart, GA. TF Roughrider suffered six fatalities while deployed to Afghanistan:
MAJ Kevin M. Jenrette (4 June 2009) 
SGT Jeffrey W. Jordan (4 June 2009) 
SFC John C. Beale (4 June 2009) 
1SG John D. Blair (20 June 2009) 
SGT Isaac L. Johnson, Jr. (6 July 2009) 
SGT Raymundo P. Morales (21 July 2009)

Leadership & Organization

Organization
Headquarters and Headquarters Troop, located in Calhoun, Georgia
Apache Troop (Cavalry), located in Cedartown, Georgia
Blackfoot Troop (Cavalry), located in Canton, Georgia
Cobra Troop (Infantry), located in Dalton, Georgia
Dragon Company (Forward Support), 148th Brigade Support Battalion, located in Calhoun, Georgia (attached)

Lineage 
Constituted 19 June 1959 in the Georgia Army National Guard as the 108th Armor, a parent regiment under the Combat Arms Regimental System

Organized 1 July 1959 from the following units to consist of the 1st Reconnaissance Squadron and the 2d, 3d, and 4th Medium Tank Battalions, elements of the 48th Armored Division:

48th Reconnaissance Battalion (organized in 1902 at Jackson) as the 1st Reconnaissance Squadron
163d Tank Battalion (organized in 1924 at Calhoun) as the 2d Medium Tank Battalion
162d Tank Battalion (organized in 1882 at Macon) as the 3d Medium Tank Battalion
190th Tank Battalion (organized in 1889 at Macon) as the 4th Medium Tank Battalion

Reorganized 1 May 1962 to consist of the 1st Reconnaissance Squadron and the 2d, 3d, and 4th Medium Tank Battalions, elements of the 48th Armored Division, and the 5th Medium Tank Battalion

Reorganized 16 April 1963 to consist of the 1st, 2d, 3d, 4th, and 5th Battalions, elements of the 48th Armored Division

Reorganized 1 January 1968 to consist of the 1st Battalion, an element of the 30th Infantry Division

Reorganized 1 December 1973 to consist of the 1st Battalion, an element of the 48th Infantry Brigade

Withdrawn 1 June 1989 from the Combat Arms Regimental System and reorganized under the United States Army Regimental System with headquarters at Calhoun

Ordered into active federal service 30 November 1990 at home stations; released
from active federal service 27 March 1991 and reverted to state control

Ordered into active federal service 6 December 2004 – 3 January 2005 at home stations; released from active federal service 1 September – 1 October 2006 and reverted to state control

Redesignated 1 October 2005 as the 108th Armored Regiment

Consolidated 1 September 2007 with the 108th Cavalry Regiment (see ANNEX) and consolidated unit designated as the 108th Cavalry Regiment, to consist of the 1st Squadron, an element of the 48th Infantry Brigade Combat Team and the 2d Squadron, an element of the 256th Infantry Brigade Combat Team

Reorganized 1 September 2008 in the Georgia and Louisiana Army National Guard to consist of the 1st Squadron, an element of the 48th Infantry Brigade Combat Team, the 2d Squadron, an element of the 256th Infantry Brigade Combat Team, and the 3d Squadron

ANNEX

Constituted 2 September 1995 in the Georgia and Louisiana Army National Guard as the 108th Cavalry, a parent regiment under the United States Army Regimental System; concurrently organized from existing elements to consist of Troop A, an element of the 256th Infantry Brigade, and Troop E, an element of the 48th Infantry Brigade

(Troop E ordered into active federal service 6 December 2004 – 3 January 2005 at Griffin, Georgia)

Redesignated 1 October 2005 as the 108th Cavalry Regiment

Reorganized 1 September 2006 to consist of the 2d Squadron, an element of the 256th Infantry Brigade Combat Team, and Troop E, an element of the 48th Infantry Brigade

(Troop E released from active federal service 1 September – 1 October 2006 and reverted to state control)

Honors

Campaign Participation Credit
The squadron has received participation credit for the following campaigns:

War on Terrorism
Campaigns to be determined

World War II
Guadalcanal
New Guinea
Leyte
Luzon

Awards & Decorations

See also
108th Cavalry Regiment
Order of the Spur

References

Reconnaissance squadrons of the United States Army